The Attack of the Giant Moussaka  (1999), is a Greek science fiction parody film, produced, written and directed by Panos H. Koutras. It has been released theatrically in France, with French subtitles, and Japan, with Japanese subtitles. It has been screened at several festivals, including specialised LGBT film festivals, and has achieved cult status.

Premise
The city of Athens is at war with a terrifying gigantic moussaka accidentally produced when an ordinary serving is hit by a ray from an alien space ship.

Cast
Yannis Aggelakis as Tara
Myriam Vourou as Joy Boudala
Christos Mantakas as Alexis Alexiou
Gregory Patrikareas as Antonis Boudalas
Eugene Dimitriou as Aris Boudalas
Themis Bazaka as Evi Bay
Roubini Vasilakopoulou as Aleka Spay
Jenny Balatsinou as doctor
Dorothea Mercouri as Gora
Hilda Iliopoulou as Daizy Karra
Nikos Saropoulos as Dinos Dinou
Michalis Pantos as Dimis
Maria Kavadia as Chanel

See also
 Super Demetrios

References

External links 
 Official film site
 The Attack of the Giant Mousaka at the Internet Movie Database
 Page for the film on Allocine.fr (French)

1999 films
Greek speculative fiction films
Greek LGBT-related films
Giant monster films
1990s science fiction comedy films
1990s Greek-language films
1990s English-language films
English-language Greek films
1990s French-language films
1990s Russian-language films
Greek horror films
LGBT-related horror films
LGBT-related science fiction films
1999 comedy films
1999 LGBT-related films
1999 multilingual films
Greek multilingual films
Films shot in Athens